Robert Hodgkinson (28 August 1902 – date of death unknown) was an English professional football who played as a forward. He made appearances in the English Football League for Wrexham over two spells at the club.

He also played for Loughborough, Burton All Saints, Oswestry Town, Whitchurch and Llandudno.

References

1902 births
Date of death unknown
English footballers
Association football forwards
English Football League players
Loughborough F.C. players
Burton Town F.C. players
Wrexham A.F.C. players
Oswestry Town F.C. players
Whitchurch F.C. players
Llandudno F.C. players